This article is a list of historic places in the Northwest Territories entered on the Canadian Register of Historic Places, whether they are federal, provincial, or municipal.

List of historic places

See also 

 List of National Historic Sites of Canada in the Northwest Territories

Northwest Territories
Northwest Territories
History of the Northwest Territories